Félix Pérez Marcos (13 June 1901 – 12 September 1983) was a Spanish footballer.

Club career
At club level, he played for the three main teams in Madrid at the time: Real Madrid, Racing de Madrid and Atlético Madrid.

International career
As a Real Madrid player, he was eligible to play for the Madrid national team, and he was part of the team that reached the final of the 1923-24 Prince of Asturias Cup, an inter-regional competition organized by the RFEF. In that infamous final, it was Félix who opened the scoring after just 8 minutes against Catalonia in an eventual 4–4 draw, losing the replay 2-3 two days later.

He earned just one cap for the Spain national football team, which was against France on 27 May 1927.

References

External links
 

1901 births
1983 deaths
Spanish footballers
Spain international footballers
Footballers from Madrid
Association football midfielders
Real Madrid CF players
Footballers at the 1924 Summer Olympics
Olympic footballers of Spain